Jordan Connor Yuen (born 17 September 1991) is a Canadian actor. He plays Sweet Pea in the television series Riverdale. He has also appeared in Looking for Alaska, Hospital Show and Nurses.

Early life 
Connor was born in Calgary but moved to Vancouver when he was two years old. He grew up in Delta, located in the Greater Vancouver area. Connor's father was born in Canada and is mostly of Chinese descent, mixed with Vietnamese, Thai, Indonesian, Samoan and more. His mother is from Croatia. According to a DNA test he did, he also has Eastern European, Spanish, Greek, Italian, German and Native American roots. He has a brother, Brad, and a sister, Nicole.

Connor said he knew he wanted to be an actor since he was around 10–11 years old. Connor attended Sands Secondary School, where he did theatre and played football. His first performance was in his school's production of Guys and Dolls. After receiving a football scholarship to the University of British Columbia, Connor put acting aside to focus on football while he was studying architecture. During a game at the end of his second year, Connor broke his leg when he was tackled, ending his football career. Bedridden and unable to walk for three months, Connor became depressed. After his leg healed, Connor found work as a stuntperson when the show Hellcats came to his football team seeking stuntpeople. Rediscovering his love for acting on the set, Connor continued doing stunt and background work for about a year.

Eventually, Connor left university to pursue acting more seriously. He began acting training at the Railtown Actors Studio in Vancouver. While training on and off for five years, Connor booked small parts and also worked in other jobs, including bartending at a restaurant, working for a marketing company and selling mobile phones. He also owned a theatre company with friends.

Career 
Connor's breakthrough role was as Sweet Pea in the television series Riverdale. Connor had auditioned for other characters such as Joaquin and Reggie before reading for Sweet Pea. First introduced in the show's second season (which premiered in October 2017), Connor was originally supposed to only have four episodes but his role was later expanded to a recurring role.

In March 2019, Connor was cast as Kevin in Looking for Alaska, a miniseries adaptation of John Green's novel. The series was released on Hulu on 18 October 2019. In 2019, Connor appeared in Hospital Show, a 10-part comedy web series which premiered on YouTube on 10 October 2019. In April 2020, Connor was one of the celebrity contestants in the first episode of RuPaul's Secret Celebrity Drag Race. Competing against Jermaine Fowler and Nico Tortorella, Connor won the episode, winning $30,000 for his charity of choice, Cystic Fibrosis Canada.

In August 2020, it was announced that Connor had joined the cast of Canadian medical drama series Nurses for its second season.

Personal life 
Connor and his long-term partner, Jinjara Mitchell, got engaged on 22 September 2018. They got married on 4 September 2021.

Filmography

Films

Television

Music videos

References

External links 
 

1991 births
Living people
Canadian male film actors
Canadian male television actors
University of British Columbia Faculty of Applied Science alumni
Male actors from Calgary
Canadian male actors of Chinese descent
21st-century Canadian male actors
Canadian people of Croatian descent